Margaret Masson Hardie Hasluck M.B.E. (1944) (18 June 1885 – 18 October 1948) was a Scottish geographer, linguist, epigrapher, archaeologist and scholar.

Biography
Margaret Hasluck was born Margaret Hardie and graduated from Aberdeen University where she received Honors in Classics in 1907, and then went to Cambridge, completing her studies with honours in 1911. She was not awarded a degree because Cambridge did not award degrees to women until 1948. Hasluck then attended the British School in Athens and worked in the field at Pisidian antioch and published, "The Shrine of Men Askaenos at Pisidian Antioch" and "Dionysos at Smyrna". Marrying Frederick William Hasluck, Assistant Director of the British School in Athens, they honeymooned in Konya, and, based in Athens, the couple travelled throughout Turkey and the Balkans. In 1916 Frederick contracted tuberculosis and died four years later in Switzerland, and Hardie-Hasluck moved to England to edit her husband's books and published them under the name of Margaret Hasluck.

Hasluck then travelled to Albania where she undertook anthropological research in Macedonia and made her home in Elbasan for 13 years, becoming a legend among the Albanians and publishing numerous articles, including the first English-Albanian grammar and reader. Due to her intelligence work in World War I, she was forced to leave Albania for Athens when the Italians annexed the country in 1939. While in Albania, Hasluck is said to have been romantically involved with Albanian scholar and politician Lef Nosi, to whom she left her rich personal library.

When Athens became unsafe, she moved to Istanbul as an observer and advised the British Government intelligence about the Albanian situation. Later she went to Cairo, always carrying the Albanian cause with her. In 1945 she was diagnosed as having leukaemia and moved to Cyprus and then to Dublin where she died on 18 October 1948.

On Friday 18 June 2010, the 125th anniversary of her birth, a ceremony took place on her property in Elbasan, Albania. Attended by the prefect of the Elbasan District, Shefqet Deliallisi, the Mayor of Elbasan Qazim Sejdini and Her Excellency Fiona McIlwham, British Ambassador to Albania among many guests, the ceremony was also attended by several members of Margaret's Hardie Family. A plaque was jointly unveiled on her property by her nephew John Donald Morrison Hardie OBE and Qazim Sejdini, Mayor of Elbasan. After a presentation on the life of Margaret Hasluck, held at the 'Home of Hope / Shtëpia e Shpresës' Orphanage which occupies a building on her property, the children of the orphanage gave a presentation of costumes and music, which was followed by a reception at the Home of Hope. Margaret Hasluck's family members were presented with a certificate awarding Margaret Hasluck the status 'Citizen of Honour', on the grounds of 'her outstanding contribution to the public sphere of the city of Elbasan'.[source: Gazeta Shqiptare & Shqip 19 Qershor/June 2010]

Bibliography 
 The Shrine of Men Askaenos at Pisidian Antioch, 1912
 Dionysos at Smyrna, 1912–1913
 The Significance of Greek Personal Names, 1923
 Christian Survivals among Certain Moslem Subjects of Greece, 1924
 The Nonconformist Moslems of Albania, 1925
 A Lucky Spell from a Greek Island, 1926
 The Basil-Cake of the Greek New Year, 1927
 An Unknown Turkish Shrine in Western Macedonia, 1929
 Measurements of Macedonian Men, 1929
 Traditional Games of the Turks, 1930
 Këndime Englisht-Shqip or Albanian-English Reader: Sixteen Albanian Folk-Stories Collected and Translated, with Two Grammars and Vocabularies, Cambridge, 1932 
 Physiological Paternity and Belated Birth in Albania, 1932
 Bride-Price in Albania: A Homeric Parallel, 1933
 A Historical Sketch of the Fluctuations of Lake Ostrovo in West Macedonia, 1936
 The Archaeological History of Lake Ostrovo in West Macedonia, 1936
 Causes of the Fluctuations in the Level of Lake Ostrovo, West Macedonia, 1937
 The Gypsies of Albania, 1938
 Couvade in Albania, 1939
 The Sedentary Gypsies of Metzoro, 1939
 Dervishes in Albania, 9 June 1939 Guardian Newspaper (Page 24)
 Baba Tomor, 13 September 1939 Guardian Newspaper (page 12)
 Firman of A. H. 1013–14 (A.D. 1604-5) Regarding Gypsies in the Western Balkans, 1948
 Oedipus Rex in Albania, 1949
 The unwritten law in Albania, publ. 1954,

Books edited by Margaret M. Hasluck 
 Athos and its Monasteries, 1924
 Letters on Religion and Folklore, 1926
 F.W.Hasluck, Christianity and Islam under the Sultans, 1929

References

External links
 Margaret Hasluck Collection at Marischal Virtual Museum, University of Aberdeen

Hasluck, Margaret
Hasluck, Margaret
People from Elgin, Moray
Hasluck, Margaret
Hasluck, Margaret
Hasluck, Margaret
Scottish emigrants to Ireland
Albanologists
British women archaeologists
Members of the Order of the British Empire
Travelers in Asia Minor